Erenfried II (died ) was a Lotharingian nobleman, from the area of Bonn in what is now Germany.  According to one proposal, he was a son of Eberhard I, Count of Bonngau and Zülpichgau. He could otherwise be the same as Ehrenfrid, son of Ricfrid.

He was Count in the Keldachgau, Count in the Zülpichgau (942), in the Bonngau (945), and in Hubbelrath (950).

Possibly he was also the count of this name in the Hattuariergau (947) and in the neighbouring Tubalgau (Duffelgau) (948). In this period there was also count of this name in the Belgian county of Huy, who was possibly also Vogt of Stavelot Abbey.

It is proposed that he married Richwara (died 10 July 963) and had issue:
 Hermann I, Count Palatine of Lotharingia. Although there is record of Hermann's mother being Richwara, the proposal concerning who his father was is likely but not certain.
 Erenfried, Abbot of Gorze (same as Poppo II Bishop of Würzburg (961-983)?) (fl. 999).

References 

 Instituts für Geschichtsforschung. XII. Erg.-Band. (Innsbruck, 1933) pp. 1–91.
 Gerstner, Ruth, 'Die Geschichte der lothringischen Pfalzgrafschaft (von den Anfängen bis zur Ausbildung des Kurterritoriums Pfalz)', Rheinisches Archiv 40 (Bonn, 1941)
 Friedrich Wilhelm Oedinger (arrangement): The Regests of the Archbishops of Cologne I (313-1099), Bonn 1954-1960
 Droege, G., 'Pfalzgrafschaft, Grafschaften und allodiale Herrschaften zwischen Maas und Rhein in salisch-staufischer Zeit’, Rheinische Vierteljahrsblätter 26 (1961), pp. 1–21.
 Wisplinghoff, E., 'Zur Reihenfolge der lothringischen Pfalzgrafen am Ende des 11. Jahrhunderts’, in Rheinische Vierteljahrsblätter 28 (1963) pp. 290–293.
 Steinbach, F., ‘Die Ezzonen. Ein Versuch territorialpolitischen Zusammenschlusses der fränkischen Rheinlande’, in Collectanea Franz Steinbach. Aufsätze und Abhandlungen zur Verfassungs-, Sozial- und Wirtschaftsgeschichte, geschichtlichen Landeskunde und Kulturraumforschung, ed. F. Petri & G. Droege (Bonn, 1967) pp. 64–81.
 Lewald, Ursula, 'Die Ezzonen. Das Schicksal eines rheinischen Fürstengeschlechts', in Rheinische Vierteljahrsblätter 43 (1979) pp. 120–168
 Stefan Weinfurter / Odilo Engels : Series Episcoporum Ecclesiae Catholicae Occidentalis V.1, Stuttgart 1984
 Reuter, Timothy, 'Germany in the Early Middle Ages 800–1056', New York: Longman, 1991.
 Bernhardt, John W. (2002). Itinerant Kingshiop & Royal Monasteries in Early Medieval Germany, c.936-1075. Cambridge University Press.

Links
 http://www.manfred-hiebl.de/genealogie-mittelalter/ezzonen_pfalzgrafen_bei_rhein/erenfried_2_graf_im_keldachgau_+_um_969.html
 Duchy of Berg
 Ezzonids

Ezzonids
Counts of Germany
Year of birth unknown
Year of death uncertain